Larry Weinberg (January 23, 1926 – January 1, 2019) was an American real estate developer who was one of the founders of the NBA's Portland Trail Blazers.

Biography
Born to a Jewish family in New York City, Weinberg served in the US 6th Army Group as an infantryman during World War II. He was severely wounded in combat in France and spent over a year recovering in a US military hospital. He attended Cornell University, the University of Arizona, and the University of California at Los Angeles. In 1948, Weinberg founded the Larwin Company serving as its CEO until he retired. By the late 1960s, Larwin Company became one of the largest privately owned housing companies in the United States until merging it into CNA Financial Corporation where it became  one of the three largest housing producers with annual development of 8,000 residential units. He went on to serve as a Member of the Executive Committee and the Board of Directors of CNA from 1969 to 1980. In 1950, Weinberg founded Com-Air Products, Inc. which designed, manufactured, and assembled the hydraulics, pneumatics and fuel assemblies used in jet engines and aircraft.

In 1970, Weinberg, Herman Sarkowsky, and Robert Schmertz paid $3.7 million to secure an NBA expansion team for Portland. Weinberg became president of the Trail Blazers in 1975, replacing Sarkowsky, who turned his attention to the NFL's Seattle Seahawks. Two years later, the Trail Blazers won an NBA championship. Weinberg served as team president until 1988, when he sold the team to Paul Allen. The Trail Blazers honored Weinberg in 1992 by retiring a #1 jersey with his name. Nonetheless, although no Trail Blazers had ever worn #1 before it was retired for Weinberg, nine Trail Blazers have worn #1 since, including: Rod Strickland (1993-2001), Derek Anderson (2002-2005), Jarrett Jack (2006-2008), Ike Diogu (2009), Armon Johnson (2011-2012), Jared Jeffries (2013), Dorell Wright (2014-2015), Evan Turner (2017-2019) and Anfernee Simons (2020-present).

Weinberg served as president of the American Israel Public Affairs Committee. Elected head of AIPAC in 1976 and leaving the role in 1982, Weinberg developed personal connections to Menachem Begin, developed acrimony towards Jimmy Carter, and forged an alliance with the Reagan White House. Weinberg brought in Tom Dine in 1980 and Steven Rosen as Dine's second-in-command as Dine's research director.

After leaving his role as AIPAC president in 1982, Weinberg set himself the task of creating a Washington think tank to sculpt the ideas around Middle East policy. Weinberg's wife Barbi was a founder of The Washington Institute for Near East Policy.

Weinberg was awarded the Brotherhood Award of the National Conference of Christians and Jews. 

Weinberg died on January 1, 2019, at age 92.

Notes

External links
Learn more about Larry Weinberg from NBA.com
Profile at California Building Industry Foundation website

1926 births
2019 deaths
American Israel Public Affairs Committee
American real estate businesspeople
Cornell University alumni
Military personnel from New York City
Portland Trail Blazers executives
Portland Trail Blazers owners
Sportspeople from New York City
University of Arizona alumni
University of California, Los Angeles alumni
Jewish American military personnel
21st-century American Jews